"World" is a song written and performed by James Brown. It was released as a two-part single

Background
Critic Douglas Wolk described the song as "overwrought".

Chart performance
"World" charted At #8 R&B and #37 Pop.

References

James Brown songs
Songs written by James Brown
1969 singles
1969 songs
King Records (United States) singles